The Brazilian Highlands or Brazilian Plateau is an extensive geographical region covering most of the eastern, southern and central portions of Brazil, in all some 4,500,000 km2 (1,930,511 sq mi) or approximately half of the country's land area. The vast majority of Brazil's population (190,755,799; 2010 census) lives in the highlands or on the narrow coastal region immediately adjacent to it.

Ancient basaltic lava flows gave birth to much of the region. However, the time of dramatic geophysical activity is long past, as there is now no seismic or volcanic activity. Erosion has also played a large part in shaping the Highlands, forming extensive sedimentary deposits and wearing down the mountains.

The Brazilian Highlands are recognized for its great diversity: within the region there are several different biomes, vastly different climatic conditions, many types of soil, and thousands of animal and plant species.

Major divisions

Due to its size and diversity, the Brazilian Highlands is usually divided into three main areas:

Atlantic Plateau, extending all along the eastern coast of Brazil, and including several mountain ranges. It was once almost completely covered by the Atlantic Rainforest, one of the richest areas of biodiversity in the world, of which only 7.3% remains.
Southern Plateau, advancing inland in the southern and southern-central portions of the country. Sedimentary rocks covered partially by basaltic lava spills that form the fertile ground known as "purple land". Large portions of this region were also covered by the Atlantic Rainforest, while araucaria highland forest and cerrado grasslands took up much of the rest.
Central Plateau, occupying the central portions of Brazil, with sedimentary and crystalline formations. Approximately 85% was once covered by cerrado vegetation, of which only a small portion remains intact.

In addition to the plateau regions, several adjoining or enclosed mountain ranges are considered to be part of the Brazilian Highlands. Some of the most important are (from north to south):
Serra da Borborema
Chapada Diamantina
Serra do Espinhaço
Serra do Caparaó
Serra da Mantiqueira
Serra do Mar 
Serra Geral

The highest point of the Brazilian Highlands is the Pico da Bandeira in the Serra do Caparaó, 2,891 meters (9,485 ft).

See also
Guiana Shield
Serras de Sudeste

References

Plateaus of Brazil
Regions of Brazil
Central-West Region, Brazil
Northeast Region, Brazil
Southeast Region, Brazil
South Region, Brazil
Ecoregions of Brazil
Atlantic Forest
Caatinga
Cerrado
Neotropical ecoregions
Large igneous provinces
Natural regions of South America
Physiographic divisions
Volcanism of Brazil
Highlands